Sabari Island is an island in Papua New Guinea, part of the Calvados Chain within the Louisiade Archipelago. 
Politically, it is in its own separate Ward, not like the other Calvados Chain islands which all belong to the Calvados Chain Ward. 
It is located at a reef called Tawa Tawamal .
It is the most populated island of the group. The main villages are Hekampen (at the southeastern tip), Tandeyai (south coast of the northwestern part), Hebenahine, and Maho.

References

Islands of Milne Bay Province
Louisiade Archipelago